The West Branch Piscataquis River is a  tributary of the Piscataquis River in Piscataquis County, Maine. Its source is in East Moxie, Somerset County (Maine Township 2, Range 4, BKP EKR).

See also
List of rivers of Maine

References

Maine Streamflow Data from the USGS
Maine Watershed Data From Environmental Protection Agency

Tributaries of the Penobscot River
Rivers of Piscataquis County, Maine
Rivers of Somerset County, Maine
Rivers of Maine